Vézénobres is a commune in the Gard department in southern France.

History
Vézénobres is a medieval town that is known for the intense religious wars that lasted a few centuries.  It was home to many Protestant leaders, namely, those who were directly involved in the Carmisard wars.  Eventually the Catholic Dragoons invaded and killed all of them and they were buried in the walls of their own houses.

Population

See also
Communes of the Gard department

References

External links

 The Regordane Way or St Gilles Trail, which passes through Vézénobres

Communes of Gard